North Carolina Highway 24 (NC 24) is the longest primary state highway in the U.S. state of North Carolina. Traveling east–west between the Charlotte metropolitan area and the Crystal Coast, connecting the cities of Charlotte, Fayetteville, Jacksonville and Morehead City.

Route description
Prior to the western terminus of NC 24 at Interstate 485 (I-485), the road begins as an unmarked street named W.T. Harris Boulevard at Mount Holly-Huntersville Road. The road was named for W.T. Harris, better known as one of the founders of Harris Teeter. Along the way NC 24 provides access to I-77, U.S. Route 21 (US 21), NC 115, I-85, US 29, and NC 49. At NC 27 (Albemarle Road) NC 24 makes a sharp left turn and joins that route in a concurrency, while W.T. Harris Boulevard continues further south unmarked towards US 74. 

NC 24 is both one of the longest and most concurrent routes in the state. Besides the approximately  concurrency with NC 27 between Johnsonville and Charlotte, this route also shares long stretches of pavement with:
US 258 between Richlands and Jacksonville (16.5 miles)
NC 50 between Kenansville and Warsaw (7.5 miles)
NC 87 between Fayetteville and Spout Springs (18 miles)
Shorter concurrencies with I-40, NC 903, US 421, US 701, US 17, NC 210 (twice), NC 22, NC 109, and NC 73. It also runs briefly concurrent with US 15/US 501 in Carthage. 
All told, about half of the total length of NC 24 runs concurrent with other routes.

As a route, it is designated as a "High Priority Corridor" for North Carolina, and much of it is highly traveled, providing the most direct access between Charlotte, Fayetteville and Jacksonville. It passes near or through three major Military installations (Fort Bragg, Pope Army Airfield, and Camp Lejeune), as well as Morrow Mountain State Park, Lake Tillery and the Uwharrie National Forest. Most of the route east of I-40 is at least four lanes, with sections at or near freeway grade.

Along its eastern portions, NC 24 is known as Lejeune Boulevard thru Jacksonville, Freedom Way from the Camp Lejeune Main Gate to Swansboro, Corbett Avenue through Swansboro, Cedar Point Boulevard through Cedar Point, the W. B. McLean Highway through much of central Carteret County from JCT NC 58 to its terminus in Mansfield at US 70.

History

1922: NC 24 runs from Warsaw to Laurinburg, through Fayetteville. Most of this routing west of Fayetteville is now US 401.
1925: NC 24's western terminus is extended to the South Carolina line and its eastern terminus is extended to Kenansville.
1930: The route is extended east to Swansboro, using part of US 17. Also, NC 24 is rerouted through Kenansville, Beaulaville, Richlands, and Jacksonville; NC 24 still uses most of this route today. Furthermore, NC 24 is given a more direct route from Laurinburg to Wagram.
1930s: NC 24 is rerouted numerous times after the introduction of new U.S. Highways to North Carolina.
1941: NC 24 west of Fayetteville is truncated; NC 87 and NC 78 take control of the truncated route.
1963: The western terminus of NC 24 is moved and extended to Charlotte; this produced the  concurrency with NC 27.
Mid 1960s: NC 24 is routed around Clinton and its routing through Fayetteville changed.
Early 1970s: The construction of the Cape Fear River bridge at Fayetteville removed many zigzags of NC 24 in Fayetteville.
1982: NC 24 is routed along a four-lane bypass around Vander to access the newly built I-95.
2000: NC 24 is routed onto I-40 for a segment between exits 364 and 373 and onto NC 11 around Kenansville and Warsaw. The old route was signed as Business NC 24.
2003: NC 24 splits from NC 27 in eastern Charlotte to follow Harris Boulevard to a new western terminus at I-77.
The old route is signed as Business Route 24.
2008: NC 24 western terminus is extended from I-77 to I-485 on December 8, 2008. The extension added  to the route.
2015: NC 24 was removed with NC 87 from Bragg Blvd from the city of Spring Lake, south to the I-295, instead it was placed onto I-295 over to NC 210 then follows NC 210 north to Spring Lake.
2017: NC 24 was placed on a bypass of Stedman leaving behind Clinton Rd through town.
2018: NC 24 was placed on bypasses of Autryville  and Roseboro, leaving behind NC 24 business routes.
2019: NC 24 was placed on a bypass around Troy, leaving behind NC 24-27 business routes.

Termini
In March 2003, The state DOT rerouted the west end of NC 24 from US 74 to I-77 (Exit 18). This was facilitated by following Harris Boulevard in east Charlotte instead of following NC 27. This added nearly  onto the highway's length.

Before this rerouting, NC 24 was extraneous west of Johnsonville. It was concurrent with NC 27 over its entire length to its terminus at US 74, at which point NC 27 continued while NC 24 did not.

NC 24's eastern terminus is at US 70 in Morehead City. This eastern segment leading to the terminus provides access to communities on the mainland side of the Bogue Sound.

North Carolina Highway 243

North Carolina Highway 243 (NC 243) appeared in 1931 as a renumbering of NC 24 from Hubert to Swansboro; which NC 24 went northeast to Stella then east towards Morehead City. In 1934, NC 243 was reverted to NC 24 when the White Oak River bridge was completed in Swansboro.

North Carolina Highway 605

North Carolina Highway 605 (NC 605) was established in 1932 as a new primary route between US 1/US 15/NC 50/NC 75, in Tramway, and US 421/NC 60, in Jonesboro. In 1936, NC 24 was extended northwest from Fayetteville to Tramway, replacing NC 605.

Major intersections

Special routes

Troy business loop

North Carolina Highway 24 Business (NC 24 Bus) was established in 2019 when mainline NC 24, along with NC 27, was rerouted onto new routing bypassing south of Troy.

Autryville business loop

North Carolina Highway 24 Business (NC 24 Bus) was established in 2018 when mainline NC 24 was rerouted onto new routing bypassing north of Autryville. The  business route follows the original alignment of NC 24 along Clinton Road, Williams Street, and Autry Highway.

Warsaw–Kenansville business loop

North Carolina Highway 24 Business (NC 24 Bus) was established in March, 1999 when mainline NC 24 was rerouted overlapping I-40 and NC 903 (Kenansville Bypass); the old alignment through downtown Warsaw and Kenansville was redesignated as a business loop.

Jacksonville business loop

North Carolina Highway 24 Business (NC 24 Bus) was established in January 2008 when mainline NC 24 was placed on new bypass south of Jacksonville. The business loop follows the old alignment through downtown Jacksonville, via Richlands Highway (in concurrency with US 258), Marine Boulevard (in concurrency with US 17 Business), Johnson Boulevard and Lejeune Boulevard.

See also
North Carolina Bicycle Route 6 - Concurrent with NC 24 briefly east and west of Albemarle

References

External links

NCRoads.com: N.C. 24
NCRoads.com: N.C. 24 Business
NCRoads.com: N.C. 243

024
Transportation in Charlotte, North Carolina
Transportation in Fayetteville, North Carolina
Transportation in Mecklenburg County, North Carolina
Transportation in Cabarrus County, North Carolina
Transportation in Stanly County, North Carolina
Transportation in Montgomery County, North Carolina
Transportation in Moore County, North Carolina
Transportation in Harnett County, North Carolina
Transportation in Cumberland County, North Carolina
Transportation in Sampson County, North Carolina
Transportation in Duplin County, North Carolina
Transportation in Onslow County, North Carolina
Transportation in Carteret County, North Carolina